The 2016 Finnish League Cup was the 20th season of the Finnish League Cup, Finland's second-most prestigious cup football tournament. HJK were the defending champions, having won their fifth league cup the previous year.

The cup consisted of two stages. First there was a group stage that involved the 12 Veikkausliiga teams divided into two groups. The top teams from each group then played each other in the final.

Group A

Group B

Final

Scorers

4 goals:

 Roope Riski - SJK

3 goals:

 Alfredo Morelos - HJK
 Mika Lahtinen - Ilves
 Guy Gnabouyou - Inter Turku

2 goals:

 Taye Taiwo - HJK
 Atomu Tanaka - HJK
 Jasse Tuominen - Lahti
 Aleksei Kangaskolkka - IFK Mariehamn
 Lucas Kaufmann - PK-35 Vantaa
 Njazi Kuqi - PK-35 Vantaa
 Ariel Ngueukam - SJK

1 goals:

 Domenico Fortunato - HIFK
 Matias Hänninen - HIFK
 Joni Korhonen - HIFK
 Daniel Rantanen - HIFK
 Ville Salmikivi - HIFK
 Lassi Järvenpää - HJK
 Solomon Duah - Inter Turku
 Benjamin Källman - Inter Turku
 Joni Aho - Inter Turku
 Billy Ions - PS Kemi
 Juho-Teppo Berg - PS Kemi
 Saku Kvist - PS Kemi
 Joona Veteli - PS Kemi
 Saša Jovović - PS Kemi
 Christian Eissele - PS Kemi
 Mika Ääritalo - KuPS
 Juha Hakola - KuPS
 Patrick Poutiainen - KuPS
 Mikko Kuningas - Lahti
 Mikko Hauhia - Lahti
 Kalle Multanen - Lahti
 Santeri Hostikka - Lahti
 Drilon Shala - Lahti
 Thomas Mäkinen - IFK Mariehamn
 Amos Ekhalie - IFK Mariehamn
 Josef Ibrahim - IFK Mariehamn
 Caloi - PK-35 Vantaa
 Shane Malcolm - RoPS
 Aapo Heikkilä - RoPS
 Eetu Muinonen - RoPS
 Antti Okkonen - RoPS
 Loorents Hertsi - VPS
 Jerry Voutilainen - VPS
 Samu Alanko - VPS
 Andre Clennon - VPS

References

External links
Liigacup at Veikkausliiga site

Finnish League Cup